Marcus Björk (born 7 August 1994) is a Swedish figure skater. He competed at the 2012 World Junior Championships and reached the free skate. He is a two-time national silver medalist.

Since January 2019, Björk is chairman of conservative and classical liberal student association Ateneum at Lund University.

Programs

Results 
CS: Challenger Series; JGP: Junior Grand Prix

References

External links 

 
 Marcus Björk at Tracings

Swedish male single skaters
1994 births
Living people
Sportspeople from Malmö
Competitors at the 2015 Winter Universiade
Competitors at the 2017 Winter Universiade
21st-century Swedish people